Cirrhochrista is a genus of moths of the family Crambidae described by Julius Lederer in 1863.

Species
Cirrhochrista annulifera Hampson, 1919
Cirrhochrista arcusalis (Walker, 1859)
Cirrhochrista argentiplaga Warren, 1897
Cirrhochrista aurantialis Hampson, 1919
Cirrhochrista bracteolalis Hampson, 1891
Cirrhochrista brizoalis (Walker, 1859)
Cirrhochrista caconalis C. Swinhoe, 1900
Cirrhochrista cyclophora Lower, 1903
Cirrhochrista cydippealis (Walker, 1859)
Cirrhochrista cygnalis Pagenstecher, 1907
Cirrhochrista diploschalis Hampson, 1919
Cirrhochrista disparalis (Walker, 1865)
Cirrhochrista etiennei (Viette, 1976)
Cirrhochrista excavata Gaede, 1916
Cirrhochrista fumipalpis (C. Felder, R. Felder & Rogenhofer, 1875)
Cirrhochrista fuscusa Chen, Song & Wu, 2006
Cirrhochrista grabczewskyi E. Hering, 1903
Cirrhochrista griveaudalis Viette, 1961
Cirrhochrista kosemponialis Strand, 1918
Cirrhochrista metisalis Viette, 1961
Cirrhochrista minuta C. Swinhoe, 1902
Cirrhochrista mnesidora (Meyrick, 1894)
Cirrhochrista mulleralis Legrand, 1957
Cirrhochrista nivea (de Joannis, 1932)
Cirrhochrista oxylalis Viette, 1961
Cirrhochrista perbrunnealis T. B. Fletcher, 1910
Cirrhochrista poecilocygnalis Strand, 1915
Cirrhochrista primulina Hampson, 1919
Cirrhochrista pulchellalis Lederer, 1863
Cirrhochrista punctulata Hampson, 1896
Cirrhochrista quinquemaculalis Strand, 1915
Cirrhochrista saltusalis Schaus, 1893
Cirrhochrista semibrunnea Hampson, 1896
Cirrhochrista spinuella Chen, Song & Wu, 2006
Cirrhochrista spissalis (Guenée, 1854)
Cirrhochrista trilinealis Pagenstecher, 1900
Cirrhochrista xanthographis Hampson, 1919

References

Spilomelinae
Crambidae genera
Taxa named by Julius Lederer